Downtown Tulsa is an area of approximately  surrounded by an inner-dispersal loop created by Interstate 244, US 64, and US 75. The area serves as Tulsa's financial and business district, and is the focus of a large initiative to draw tourism, which includes plans to capitalize on the area's historic architecture. Much of Tulsa's convention space is located in downtown, such as the Tulsa Performing Arts Center and the Tulsa Convention Center, and the BOK Center. Prominent downtown sub-districts include the Blue Dome District, the Tulsa Arts District, and the Greenwood Historical District, which includes the site of ONEOK Field, a baseball stadium for the Tulsa Drillers opened in 2010.

In 2010, the estimated population of downtown is 4,000. The daytime population is estimated to be 36,000.

Downtown districts
Tulsa includes many structures built during the Oil Boom in the 1920s and 1930s, including Art Deco buildings such as the Mid-Continent Tower, Boston Avenue Methodist Church, and the Exchange Bank Building (today known as the 320 South Boston Building). Oilman Waite Phillips, left a significant architectural impact on downtown Tulsa through the Philtower and Philcade buildings. Other notable Tulsa buildings include the Atlas Life Building, Holy Family Cathedral, Holy Trinity Greek Orthodox Church, and the Mayo Hotel, the former of which once served as home to J. Paul Getty. Known for a time as "Terra Cotta City", Tulsa hosted the International Sixth Congress on Art Deco in 2001.

Downtown Tulsa is in the northwest quadrant of the city and is ringed by an expressway system called the inner dispersal loop. Downtown's buildings include many large office towers. At , the BOK Tower (formerly One Williams Center) was the tallest building in any of the 5 "plains states" (Oklahoma, Kansas, Nebraska, North Dakota and South Dakota) until the Devon Tower in Oklahoma City was completed in 2012. The BOK Tower was designed in 1975 by Minoru Yamasaki & Associates, the same architect who designed the World Trade Center in New York City.

The Tulsa Performing Arts Center occupies a half city block in Tulsa's historical downtown. The PAC is also the design of Minoru Yamasaki. It houses five theatres and a reception hall. More than a quarter of a million people visit the Center each year to attend a performance from one of Tulsa's seven acclaimed musical and dramatic companies including the Tulsa Ballet, Tulsa Symphony Orchestra, Tulsa Opera, and a variety of symphonic groups. The PAC hosts a multitude of cultural events through the fall, winter and spring.

In 2005 the City of Tulsa broke ground on a 19,199 seat regional events center designed by architect César Pelli. The arena was named the BOK Center (or Bank of Oklahoma Center) and opened on August 30, 2008.

Blue Dome District

Another popular downtown entertainment district is the Blue Dome, named for a distinctive, domed building at Second Street and Elgin Avenue, in the area in the eastern section of downtown. The building was originally constructed in 1924 as a Gulf Oil service station. It has been converted to an information desk/office for the district, and is about two blocks south of the OneOK field.

The Blue Dome District is known for its local dining options, large art festival, and scenic Downtown Tulsa views. Every May, the Blue Dome Arts Festival allows families to enjoy local music and street vendors surrounding the historic dome. Further, there is no bad angle for pictures of Tulsa's infamous skyline in this district. With so many delicious restaurants and walkable views, it is no wonder that the Blue Dome District continues to bring its unique art scene to Tulsa.

Deco District 
Tulsa boasts one of the nation’s most extensive collections of Art Deco architecture, which is most visible in the downtown Deco District. This region spans the area from 1st to 8th street, with borders at Boston and Cheyenne. This area is located in the heart of the skyscrapers of Downtown Tulsa and thus has many food, beverage, and fitness options readily available. The Bartlett Square at 5th and Main provides a unique European feel to this region, but the entire area is overflowing with Tulsa charm.

The Philtower and Philcade buildings, the Atlas Life building, Tulsa Club, and Public Service Company of Oklahoma building are some of the most prominent displays of the Art Deco architecture style in Tulsa. Many tours of this region are readily available. Perhaps one of the more interesting facts about the Art Deco region are the tunnels which connect many of the classic buildings. They are now open for public tours, providing interested guests with a one of a kind Tulsa experience. Beyond the extensive variety of local shops and restaurants, this district annually hosts one of the largest festivals in Tulsa: Mayfest. Every May, the Deco District comes alive during Mayfest, where artists, vendors, and live musicians combine to create one of the largest street festivals in Tulsa.

East Village
East Village comprises 115 acres bordered by East 2nd and East 7th Streets, Detroit Avenue and Lansing Avenue, just inside the inner-dispersal loop. This area boasts an upscale martini bar, a hair salon, a pet day care, photography studios, lofts, a knitting room and living arts district, among others. The cornerstone of this neighborhood is the fifth largest LGBT community center in the United States, the Dennis R. Neill Equality Center, owned and operated by Oklahomans for Equality/OkEq (formerly Tulsa Oklahomans for Human Rights/TOHR), with further development being planned for more restaurants, residential lofts and retail. Oklahomans for Equality has hosted Tulsa Pride on the first weekend of June each year since 1982.

The development in the East Village has provided Tulsans and visitors with many food and entertainment opportunities. With areas like the Bond Center for large events intertwined with luxurious apartment complexes, the feeling of community is particularly strong within this area. The Boxyard- a shopping complex made from repurposed shipping containers- has quickly become a popular destination for local shopping and eating within the East Village. The annual MOJO music fest occurs in this region, mixing live music with local craft beers and food trucks. Regardless of interest, the East Village District has something for everyone in Downtown Tulsa.

Greenwood Historical District

The Greenwood Historical District is just north of downtown and east of the Brady District. It was once one of the most affluent African-American communities in the United States and referred to as Black Wall Street.  In 1921, thirty-five blocks of businesses and residences were burned in this district during the infamous Tulsa Race Riot, the bloodiest racial riot in the history of the United States. The Oklahoma Legislature passed laws in 2001 aimed at revitalizing Greenwood, setting up a scholarship fund for college-bound descendants of riot victims and appropriating $2 million for a riot memorial. As of 2004, two blocks of the old neighborhood have been restored and are part of the Greenwood Historical District. It is now home to the Greenwood Cultural Center, the Tulsa Race Riot Memorial, and the Oklahoma Jazz Hall of Fame, as well as Oklahoma State University - Tulsa and Langston University-Tulsa.

Because of its rich history, the Greenwood Historical District provides visitors with one of the most unique cultural experiences in Tulsa. The John Hope Franklin Reconciliation Park details the relationship between African-Americans and the state of Oklahoma throughout history with an emphasis on the Tulsa Race Riot. The Mabel B Little Heritage House takes visitors back to the 1920s with its classic furnishings and information about the Riots. The Greenwood Cultural Center strives to educate on the unique history of the Greenwood District, with a focus on jazz and the blues as well. Alongside these important landmarks in the Greenwood District lies a growing retail district bordering OneOK Field on the east. With an ever-increasing number of food and dessert options in the region, Greenwood Historical District is a great stop to learn about Tulsa's history and refuel.

Tulsa Arts District
Formerly known as the Brady Arts District, the Tulsa Art District is located north across the Santa Fe Railroad tracks from the central business district and centered at Main Street & Brady Avenue. The Brady District is one of Tulsa's oldest areas, characterized by two-story brick warehouses.

The Brady Theater, built between 1912 and 1914, was originally designed to serve as the city's municipal auditorium and was simply called "Convention Hall" for the first forty years of its life and was one of three internment camps where African Americans were detained after the 1921 Tulsa Race Riot.  In 1952, major additions were added and the building was renamed Tulsa Municipal Theater.  The building was listed on the National Register of Historic Places in 1979.  Supplanted as the city auditorium in 1979 by construction of the Performing Arts Center in downtown, "the Old Lady on Brady" continues to be used today for a wide variety of concerts and theatrical productions.

North of the Brady on Main Street is the Cain's Ballroom, formerly the garage of the Brady family and the home of Bob Wills and his band, the Texas Playboys. The district is also the location of many local artists' galleries, restaurants with late night hours, bars and dance clubs. It is also an emerging gay neighborhood, with several gay or gay-friendly bars and numerous supportive shops and restaurants.

A few blocks southeast of Cain's Ballroom lies one of the gems of the Downtown Tulsa area- the Guthrie Green. This urban park is a cross between a garden and an amphitheater with events ranging from movie nights to workout classes hosted there. With family friendly concerts, food truck Wednesday's, and fountains to play in, the Guthrie Green has become a central point for the Tulsa Arts District. In fact, on the first Friday of every month, local businesses in this area center their First Friday Art Crawl around the Green, with exhibits at Philbrook Downtown, 108 Contemporary, and the Hardesty Arts Center (AHHA) which border the park. This monthly event brings the community together to enjoy the best food, drinks, and entertainment that the Tulsa Arts District can provide.

Today, the Tulsa Arts District is one of the most diverse areas in all of Tulsa. It hosts restaurants, clubs, museums, and businesses and is a prime example of urban living. There is presently construction which will more than double the number of permanent residents in this artistic conclave. On its present path, the area will continue to develop as a hub of the community welcoming all people as it acknowledges its past while looking to a vibrant and inclusive future.

Economy
Major employers in Downtown Tulsa include the corporate headquarters of Williams Companies and ONEOK. BOK Financial is headquartered there as well.

Media
The Tulsa World and This Land Press have their headquarters in Downtown Tulsa.

Gallery

See also
Tulsa
List of companies based in Tulsa, Oklahoma

References

External links
https://web.archive.org/web/20131207090629/http://tulsadowntown.org/index/1011/home

Neighborhoods in Tulsa, Oklahoma
Tulsa metropolitan area
Tulsa